Praealticus natalis, the Christmas rockskipper, Natal blenny or the Natal rockskipper, is a species of combtooth blenny found in coral reefs around Christmas Island in the eastern Indian Ocean.  This species grows to a length of  TL.

References

natalis
Taxa named by Charles Tate Regan
Fish described in 1909